Bugio Island — is one of the three islands of the Portuguese Desertas Islands archipelago, a small chain of islands in the Madeira Islands Archipelago
of Macaronesia.

It is located in the Atlantic Ocean off the western coast of North Africa, and to the southeast of Madeira Island.

Nature reserve
The island is part of the Desertas Islands nature reserve, with no approach to the island closer than 100 m without a permit.

The island has breeding Desertas petrels.

See also
Deserta Grande Island
Ilhéu Chão — Chão islet.

External links
Madeirabirds.com: Desertas Islands boat trips
Madeiraarchipelago.com: photos of the Desertas Islands—Ilhas Desertas

Islands of the Autonomous Region of Madeira
Uninhabited islands of Portugal